The following is a list of the mayors and political chiefs of the Dnipro city administration, covering the period from 1786 to the present day. Originally the city was known as Yekaterinoslav. Dnipro is Ukraine's third largest city with over a million inhabitants, and is a major industrial and financial centre.

The position was established sometime in 1786 when the city merchant Ivan Shevelyov was elected the first head of the city. Since 1999 the city's chief administration position (city mayor) is elected by popular vote and officially known as Head of the city.

Name of the position
 1786 - 1917 Head of the city
 1917 - 1941 unknown (either Head of the city's council or executive committee)
 1943 - 1998 Head of the city's executive committee (according to the city's web portal)
 1999 - present Head of the city (City mayor)

Russian Empire

Yekaterinoslav

Novorossiysk

Yekaterinoslav

Ukraine
(Ukrainian People's Republic)

Ukrainian SSR

Dnepropetrovsk / Dnipropetrovsk

Ukraine

Dnipropetrovsk

Dnipro

See also
 Dnipro history
 History of Dnipro city (in German)

References

 
Dnipro
Dnipro